Athiratha is a 2017 Indian Kannada action thriller film directed by Mahesh Babu. It stars Chethan Kumar and Latha Hegde, with Kabir Duhan Singh and Sadhu Kokila in supporting roles. The score and soundtrack are by Suraag and the cinematography is by Jai Anand.

The film is a remake of Tamil film Kanithan (2016).

Plot 
The film depicts Akash (Chethan) as a TV reporter on Spy TV. He is investigating a minister's scandal in a pub with his friend. He meets a girl named Mary (Latha Hegde), working on the same TV channel as a reporter. His father (Avinash) is a news anchor on the Doordarshan channel. He tells him to quit that job and find other work.

One day, police falsely arrest him together with four other youths, charging them with a money scandal of taking loans with falsified papers. One of the youths dies in a road accident while trying to escape court.

Akash's lawyer friend Ravishankar Gowda releases him on bail. He searches for the truth behind the scandal. Akash collects all duplicate certificates from Sarka's (Kabir Duhan Sigh) mafia places, with the help of his colleagues and gives the evidence to the TV channel.

The news goes viral, and Sarka sees it. He starts to think about who exposed his mafia. Sarka sends his goons to interrogate the TV reporters one by one. They disclose Akash's name. Sarka takes his colleagues hostage. Akash kills two of Sarka's goons, and Sarka kills two of Akash's friends and his uncle (Achyuth Rao).

Akash is determined to reveal the evidence, so he sends his friend to the mafia headquarters to collect more; he stays outside. Akash unsuccessfully tries to telecast the evidence secured to TV networks. Akash and his buddies reach a news office, where Akash sends the crew in while he fights Sarka off.

Sarka recovers and once again tries to take Akash out. He runs into a machine and falls into a coma. Police seize his mafia cohorts and take them into custody. Akash gets a job on a  BBC affiliate channel. In the last scene, Sarka is killed by a student doctor.

Cast
 Chethan Kumar as Akash, News Reporter
 Latha Hegde as Adithi, Akash's colleague
 Kabir Duhan Singh as Sarka, Mafia don of money and duplicate certificate scandal
 Sadhu Kokila as A TV Channel owner
 Avinash as Akash's father, News Host in Dooradarshan
 Achyuth Kumar as Avinash's friend, Police Constable 
 Ravishankar Gowda as Akash's lawyer friend
 Parkourpaiyan
 Sudha Belawadi as Akash's mother
 Aruna Balraj as the mother of one of the youths accused in the case 
 Ester Noronha as item number
 Prashanth Siddi as Ningu, one of the News Reporter  in Spy TV

Soundtrack

The film's background score and the soundtracks were composed by debut artist Suraag, son of Sadhu Kokila. The music rights were acquired by Loop Entertainment.

References

External links
 

2017 films
2010s Kannada-language films
2017 action thriller films
2017 crime action films
2017 crime thriller films
Indian action thriller films
Indian crime action films
Films about the mass media in India
Action films based on actual events
Journalism adapted into films
Films about journalists
Films about organised crime in India
Techno-thriller films
Films about security and surveillance
Thriller films based on actual events
Indian crime thriller films
Films about corruption in India
Fictional portrayals of the Karnataka Police
Films shot in Mysore
Films shot in Bangkok
Films about fraud
Kannada remakes of Tamil films